Glyphodes strialis is a moth in the family Crambidae. It was described by Wang in 1963. It is found in China (Yunnan).

References

Moths described in 1963
Glyphodes